Jessica Mansell (born 13 January 1989 in Sydney, Australia) is a former Australian netball player. She played for Hunter Jaegers in the 2007 Commonwealth Bank Trophy, for NNSW Waratahs in the 2008 Australian Netball League and for New South Wales Swifts in the 2009 ANZ Championship.

References

1988 births
Living people
Australian netball players
Hunter Jaegers players
New South Wales Swifts players
Netball New South Wales Waratahs players
Australian Netball League players
ANZ Championship players
Netball players from Sydney